
The Socialist Education Movement (abbreviated 社教运动 or 社教運動), also known as the Four Cleanups Movement was a movement launched by Mao Zedong in 1963 in the People's Republic of China. Mao sought to remove reactionary elements within the bureaucracy of the Chinese Communist Party (CCP), saying that "governance is also a process of socialist education."

Chinese researchers have pointed out the movement resulted in at least 77,560 deaths, with 5,327,350 people being persecuted. In the movement, the relationship between CCP Chairman Mao Zedong and Chinese President Liu Shaoqi, Chairman Mao's potential successor, deteriorated. The Socialist Education Movement is regarded as the precursor of the Cultural Revolution, during which President Liu was persecuted to death as a "traitor" and "capitalist roader".

Goals 
During the 1960s, Mao's view of class struggle focused on two distinct dimensions. One level was class struggle within society to avoid revisionism, a process which required socialist education. The second level was struggle within the Party itself to address bureaucratism and the fear that Party bureaucrats might become a new bourgeoise.

Thus, the goal of the socialist education movement was to cleanse politics, economy, organization, and ideology (the four cleanups). It was to last until 1966. What this movement entailed was that intellectuals were sent to the countryside to be re-educated by peasants (see Down to the Countryside Movement). They still attended school, but also worked in factories and with peasants.

Aftermath 
The campaign is described by Donald Klein in the Encyclopedia Americana 2007 (Grolier Online), as a "nearly complete failure." Mao's dissatisfaction over this program's inefficacy set the stage for the Cultural Revolution (1966-1976). 

When the Cultural Revolution began, rural regions had not yet completed the Socialist Education Movement, and the committees in charge of it converted into Cultural Revolution leading groups.

See also
 Thought reform in the People's Republic of China, 1951-1952
 List of campaigns of the Chinese Communist Party
 List of massacres in China
 Seven Thousand Cadres Conference
 Taoyuan Experience

References

The Socialist Education Movement, People's Daily website, in Simplified Chinese

Political repression in China
Campaigns of the Chinese Communist Party
Maoist terminology
Cold War history of China
Maoist China
Persecution of intellectuals
Liu Shaoqi